Exostosin-like 3 is a protein that in humans is encoded by the EXTL3 gene.

References

Further reading